A. Lawrence Chickering is an American public policy analyst, attorney and the founder and president of Educate Girls Globally. 

Chickering is a research fellow at the Hoover Institution. He is the author of Beyond Left and Right: Breaking the Political Stalemate, Voice of the People: The Transpartisan Imperative in American Life and  Strategic Foreign Assistance: Civil Society in International Security. 

As president of Educate Girls Globally, he implemented a program for promoting girls’ education and empowering traditional communities by reforming government schools.

References

Hoover Institution people
Public policy research
American lawyers
Living people
Year of birth missing (living people)
Place of birth missing (living people)